Bavan (also Romanized as Bāvān) is a village in Sumay-ye Jonubi Rural District, Sumay-ye Beradust District, Urmia County, West Azerbaijan Province, Iran. At the 2006 census, its population was 1,040, in 181 families.

References 

Populated places in Urmia County